The 2021 World Judo Mixed Team Juniors Championships was held in Obelia, Italy on 10 October as part of the 2021 World Judo Juniors Championships.

Results

Repechage

References

External links
 

World Judo Junior Championships
World Juniors 2021